The Cabinet of Milan Piroćanac was sworn in on November 2, 1880. It was marked by several important events in the history of Modern Serbia. In 1881, this Government decided to build a railroad through Serbia, in order to link Serbia with both Central Europe and Ottoman Turkey. The best financial terms were offered by a French company Union générale; however, it seemed that this company got a hold of this job by bribing senior officials. Also, this Cabinet saw a signing of the Secret Convention between Serbia and Austria-Hungary on June 28, 1881, that basically put Serbian foreign policy under Vienna's tutelage. On March 6, 1882, the Principality of Serbia was raised to the rank of Kingdom, with Prince Milan becoming King Milan I of Serbia. In 1883, this cabinet also witnessed the Timok Rebellion in Zaječar District, when the representatives of People's Radical Party rose up against this government.

Cabinet members

See also
Milan Piroćanac
Cabinet of Serbia

References

Serbia
Cabinets established in 1880
Cabinets disestablished in 1883
1880 establishments in Serbia